Orhan Şam (born 1 June 1986) is a retired Turkish footballer who played as a right back or centre back.

Career
His professional football debut for Gençlerbirliği was on 25 May 2003 against Samsunspor. He played on loan contract with Hacettepe in 2005, Mardinspor in 2006 and Hacettepe again between 2006 and 2009.  He captained Gençlerbirliği between 2009 and 2011.

After Şam's successful season in 2010–11, he was transferred to Turkish champions Fenerbahçe for €3.5 on a four-year deal. Orhan get applause for his fight in Fenerbahçe. He played 20 matches in Fenerbahçe.

References

External links
 
 

1986 births
Living people
Turkish footballers
Süper Lig players
TFF First League players
TFF Second League players
Turkey under-21 international footballers
Gençlerbirliği S.K. footballers
Hacettepe S.K. footballers
Mardinspor footballers
Fenerbahçe S.K. footballers
Kasımpaşa S.K. footballers
Elazığspor footballers
Association football fullbacks
Turkey youth international footballers